The 1927 Tennessee Volunteers football team (variously "Tennessee", "UT" or the "Vols") represented the University of Tennessee in the 1927 Southern Conference football season. Playing as a member of the Southern Conference (SoCon), the team was led by head coach Robert Neyland, in his second year, and played their home games at Shields–Watkins Field in Knoxville, Tennessee.  The 1927 Vols won eight, lost zero and tied one game (8–0–1 overall, 5–0–1 in the SoCon). The only blemish on Tennessee's schedule was a tie with in-state rival, Vanderbilt.  Playing seven home games, the 1927 Vols outscored their opponents 246 to 26 and posted seven shutouts.

Before the season
Robert Neyland was hired to coach Tennessee in 1926 by Nathan Dougherty with the explicit goal to "even the score with Vanderbilt", and had his first great team in 1927.

Schedule

Season summary

Carson–Newman
In the season opener, Tennessee beat in-state opponent Carson–Newman 33–0.

North Carolina
In the second week of play, Tennessee defeated UNC 26–0. The starting lineup was Lowe (left end), McArthur (left tackle), F. Johnson (left guard), Butcher (center), Burgers (right guard), Hundley (right tackle), Alley (right end), Elmore (quarterback), Derryberry (left halfback), Witt (right halfback), Dodson (fullback).

Maryville
The Vols beat the Maryville Scots 7–0.

Ole Miss
Tennessee had an easy 21–7 victory over the Ole Miss Rebels, weakening in the last quarter for the first touchdown scored on the Vols. Passes from  Witt and runs by Dodson got Tennessee's scores.

The starting lineup was McKeen (left end), McArthur (left tackle), Barnhill (left guard), Butcher (center), Tripp (right guard), Elliott (right tackle), Alley (right end), Elmore (quarterback), Derryberry (left halfback), Witt (right halfback), Dodson (fullback).

Transylvania
The season's fifth shutout, Tennessee beat Transylvania 42–0.

Virginia
The Volunteers beat the Virginia Cavaliers 42–0. The starting lineup was McKeen (left end), McArthur (left tackle), Barnhill (left guard), Butcher (center), Tripp (right guard), Elliott (right tackle), Alley (right end), Elmore (quarterback), Derryberry (left halfback), Witt (right halfback), Dodson (fullback).

Sewanee
Tennessee beat Sewanee 32–12. The starting lineup was McKeen (left end), McArthur (left tackle), Barnhill (left guard), Butcher (center), Tripp (right guard), H. Johnson (right tackle), Alley (right end), Tudor (quarterback), Derryberry (left halfback), Witt (right halfback), Dodson (fullback).

Vanderbilt

McGugin's Commodores led 7–0 until a late Dick Dodson run tied the score. "After the game McGugin questioned each of his players as to his whereabouts during the run. Without exception the players claimed that two men had blocked them. McGugin shrugged. "Well, we'll just protest the play. It's perfectly obvious that Tennessee had twenty-two men on the field."

Vanderbilt center Vernon Sharpe arguably had the better season, but was outperformed by Tennessee's Elvin Butcher. The starting lineup was McKeen (left end), McArthur (left tackle), Barnhill (left guard), Butcher (center), Tripp (right guard), H. Johnson (right tackle), Alley (right end), Elmore (quarterback), Derryberry (left halfback), Witt (right halfback), Dodson (fullback).

Kentucky
To close the season, the Volunteers shutout the Kentucky Wildcats 20–0.  The starting lineup was McKeen (left end), McArthur (left tackle), Barnhill (left guard), Butcher (center), Tripp (right guard), H. Johnson (right tackle), Alley (right end), Elmore (quarterback), Witt (left halfback), Derryberry (right halfback), Dodson (fullback).

Postseason
Coach Alexander of Tech wrote Neyland to accept a co-championship, and no Pickens Cup was awarded.

Players

Line

Backfield

References

Additional sources
 

Tennessee
Tennessee Volunteers football seasons
Southern Conference football champion seasons
College football undefeated seasons
Tennessee Volunteers football